The Fort Scott Limestone or Fort Scott Subgroup is a geologic formation in Illinois, Kansas, Missouri, and Oklahoma. It preserves fossils dating back to the Carboniferous period.

See also

 List of fossiliferous stratigraphic units in Illinois

References

 

Carboniferous Illinois
Carboniferous Kansas
Carboniferous Missouri
Carboniferous geology of Oklahoma
Carboniferous southern paleotropical deposits